Lelio Hillel Della Torre (1805–1871) was an Italian Jewish scholar and poet writing in Italian, German, French and Hebrew, best known for his critical translation of the Book of Psalms (1845, 1854). He was the son of Solomon Jehiel Raphael ha-Kohen, chief rabbi of Cuneo, Piedmont. His father died in 1807, and Della Torre grew up as an orphan with his mother's family in Casale Monferrato, and after the death of his maternal grandfather in Asti, with his mother's brother,  Sabbatai Elhanan Treves. His uncle moved to Torino in 1820, being named chief rabbi of the Jewish communities of Piemont. Della Torre studied Greek, Latin and Italian in Torino, from the age of sixteen working as a private tutor in order to support his mother and three sisters. From 1823, he was teacher for Hebrew philology and biblical exegesis at the Jewish Collegio Colonna e Finzi in Torino. In 1826 he was ordained as rabbi, acting as rabbi of the Torino community from 1827. In 1829, he was called to Padua as professor of Talmud, homiletics and pastoral theology at the newly established rabbinical seminar there, a position he held until his death. He did not serve as rabbi again except for a brief interval in 1869 following the death of the rabbi of Padua. He was married to  Anna Bolaffio, with whom he had seven children.

Bibliography

He also wrote various scholarly articles in Classical Hebrew in the journals Kerem Ḥemed, 
Bikkure ha-'Ittim, ,Oẓar Neḥmad and Kokebe Yiẓḥaḳ.

Sources 
 Salomon Wininger, Große Jüdische National-Biographie, vol. VI,  122f.
Riccardo Di Segni: Della Torre, Lelio Hillel. In: Massimiliano Pavan (ed.): Dizionario Biografico degli Italiani (DBI) vol. 37 (1989).

References 

19th-century Italian rabbis
Hebrew-language poets
1805 births
1871 deaths
People from Cuneo
19th-century Italian poets
Italian translators
19th-century translators
Italian male poets
19th-century Italian male writers